University of the Air was a daily distance education television program seen early mornings on the CTV Television Network in Canada between October 11, 1965 and 1983; prior to the establishment of 24-hour broadcasting, in most regions it was the first program aired each day, usually at 5:30 or 6 a.m., though it would also turn up at other times. Each episode consisted of a lecture given by a university instructor. Individual episodes of this series were produced locally by CTV affiliates nationwide, for national broadcast on the CTV network under national co-ordinator Nancy Fraser.

Previous lectures of this series were also broadcast on TVO and CHCH-TV Hamilton, both as part of TVO's educational television schedule.

It was best remembered for its opening/closing title sequence, consisting of a black-bordered hexagonal kaleidoscope background and eerie electronic theme music.

In October 2014, the Dalhousie University Archives posted a number of complete episodes dating from 1976 to YouTube featuring Dalhousie lecturers.

See also
University of the Air (CBC radio series) - Similar, but unrelated, CBC Radio series

References

External links
A history of the CTV program University of the Air
University of Alberta Archives: Donald Murray Ross fonds - University of the Air episodes
The Canadian Encyclopedia: George Proctor (refers to "Canadian Music of the 20th Century" program episodes)

CTV Television Network original programming
Adult education television series
Distance education in Canada
1966 Canadian television series debuts
1983 Canadian television series endings
1980s Canadian documentary television series
Television series by Bell Media